Love Will Find Its Way to You is the fifth studio album by American country music singer Lee Greenwood. The album was released on August 11, 1986, by MCA Records.

Track listing

Personnel
Kenny Mims, Steve Gibson, Brent Mason - guitar
Bob Wray - bass guitar
Mitch Humphries - keyboards
James Stroud - drums
David Innis - synthesizer
Lee Greenwood - lead vocals
Dave Loggins, J.D. Martin, Judy Rodman, Doana Cooper, Donna McElroy, Larry Stewart, Vince Gill, Carol Chase, Dana McVicker, Greg Gordon - backing vocals

Charts

References

1986 albums
Lee Greenwood albums
MCA Records albums
Albums produced by Jerry Crutchfield